Yanagimachi is a Japanese surname. Notable people with the surname include:

 Mitsuo Yanagimachi (born 1945), Japanese screenwriter and film director
 Ryuzo Yanagimachi (born 1928), Japanese biologist
 Tatsuru Yanagimachi (born 1997), Japanese baseball player

Japanese-language surnames